The South Korea women's national under-18 ice hockey team is the women's national under-18 ice hockey team of South Korea. The team is controlled by the Korea Ice Hockey Association, a member of the International Ice Hockey Federation. The team made its international debut in January 2019 and currently play in Division I Group B of the IIHF World Women's U18 Championships.

History
The South Korea women's national under-18 ice hockey team debuted at the 2019 IIHF World Women's U18 Championship Division I Group B Qualification tournament in Jaca, Spain. Their opening game of the tournament was against Spain which they won 1–0. South Korea went on to win their next two preliminary round games, including a 5–0 win over Mexico which is currently their largest win on record. The team finished at the top of Group B in the preliminary round and were drawn against Australia for the semifinals. South Korea won their semifinal and advanced to the gold medal game against Kazakhstan. South Korea won the match 4–3 following a shootout and gained promotion to Division I Group B for 2020. The IIHF Directorate named Eom Suyeon the tournament's best defender and Kim Heewon was selected as the best South Korean player of the tournament.

In January 2020 South Korea travelled to Katowice, Poland for the 2020 IIHF World Women's U18 Championship Division I Group B. Their opening game against Austria which they lost 0–4, currently their largest loss on record. South Korea went on to finish the tournament in fourth after winning two games of their five games and finishing ahead of Poland and Great Britain. Huh Eun-Bee was named the best South Korean player of the tournament.

International competitions
2019 IIHF World Women's U18 Championship. Finish: 1st in Division I Group B Qualification (21st overall)
2020 IIHF World Women's U18 Championship. Finish: 4th in Division I Group B (18th overall)
2022 IIHF World Women's U18 Championship. Finish: 4th in Division I Group B (17th overall)

Players and personnel

Roster
From the team's most recent tournament

Team staff
From the team's most recent tournament
Head coach: Kim Sang jun
Assistant coach: Han Jae Ik
Assistant coach: Kwak Hyung Ki
Assistant coach: Lee Kyou Sun
Equipment manager: Chun Seungkeun
Physiotherapist: Lee Haeyong

References

External links
Korea Ice Hockey Association

Ice hockey teams in South Korea
Ice hockey
National team
Women's national ice hockey teams in Asia
Women's national under-18 ice hockey teams